Vestfjorden is a  long fjord or oceanic sea in Nordland county, Norway.

The name literally means "the west fjord", although it is called a fjord, it could best be described as a firth or an open bight of sea.  The "fjord" lies between the Lofoten archipelago and the Salten district of mainland Norway. The term fjord (from the old Norse fjördr meaning firth or inlet) is used more generally for bodies of water in the western Scandinavian languages than the more narrow usage assigned in English.

The Vestfjord flows from the area near the town of Narvik to the west and southwest.

The Vestfjord is famous for its cod fishery, which was exploited back to the early medieval period.  More recently, the winter invasion of Orcas in the inner parts of Vestfjord has become a tourist attraction. Strong winds with heavy seas are not uncommon in Vestfjord in winter.

Media gallery

References

Fjords of Nordland
Lofoten
Bights (geography)